Abdollah may refer to:

People
 Abdollah Jassbi, Iranian academic
 Abdollah Mojtabavi, Iranian sport wrestler
 Abdollah Hedayat, Iranian army general
 Abdollah Movahed, Iranian sport wrestler
 Abdollah Nouri, Iranian reformist politician
 Abdollah Ramezanzadeh, Iranian academic
 Abdollah Shahbazi, Iranian researcher

Places
 Abdollah, Kurdistan
 Abdollah, Sistan and Baluchestan
 Abdollah, Darmian, South Khorasan Province
 Abdollah, Yazd

See also
Abdullah (disambiguation)